Helicops hagmanni, Hagmann's keelback,  is a species of snake in the family Colubridae. It is found in Brazil, Venezuela, and Peru.

References 

Helicops
Snakes of South America
Reptiles of Brazil
Reptiles of Venezuela
Reptiles of Peru
Reptiles described in 1910
Taxa named by Jean Roux